The pricklebreast poacher (Stellerina xyosterna)is a species of poacher native to the eastern Pacific Ocean from Canada to northern Mexico. This species grows to a length of  TL. This species is the only known member of its genus.

References
 

Brachyopsinae
Monotypic fish genera
Fish described in 1880
Taxa named by David Starr Jordan